Athletics events at the 1990 South American Games were held at the Estadio Atlético de San Luis next to the Estadio Nacional in Lima, Perú, between December 6-9, 1990.  A total of 42 events were contested, 23 by men and 19 by women.

Medal summary
Medal winners were published in a book by written Argentinian journalist Ernesto Rodríguez III with support of the Argentine Olympic Committee (Spanish: Comité Olímpico Argentino) under the auspices of the Ministry of Education (Spanish: Ministerio de Educación de la Nación) in collaboration with the Office of Sports (Spanish: Secretaría de Deporte de la Nación).  Eduardo Biscayart supplied the list of winners and their results.  More results were assembled from other sources.

Men

Women

Medal table (unofficial)

References

1990
Perú
South American Games
1990 South American Games